Paul Anthony Tracy (born December 17, 1968) is a Canadian-American former professional auto racing driver who competed in CART, the Champ Car World Series and the IndyCar Series. He is known by the nicknames "PT" and "the Thrill from West Hill". He was a color commentator on NBC's IndyCar coverage from 2014 to 2021. Since 2021, he competes full time in the Superstar Racing Experience.

Racing career

Early years
Fascinated by cars since boyhood, Tracy raced go-karts at Goodwood Kartways near his hometown until he was 16. At age 16, in 1985, he became the youngest ever Canadian Formula Ford Champion. He was also the winner of the final Can-Am race in series history at the age of 17; in that same race, he achieved the record of the youngest winner in Can-Am history.
In 1988 Tracy raced in the New Zealand Formula Pacific series driving a Graeme Lawrence entered Ralt RT4, his best result was to win both races and the round at Timaru Raceway.

Tracy worked his way up through the North American open-wheel feeder series' culminating with winning the 1990 American Racing Series Championship, and in the process set a record for single-season wins with nine.

Penske and Newman/Haas years

The following year, Tracy competed in his first IndyCar event at Long Beach, renting a vehicle from Dale Coyne Racing for $105,000. Noticed by Roger Penske, at mid-season, he became a test driver for Penske Racing. In his first race for the team at Michigan he crashed and broke his left leg. He recovered and raced twice more for the team during the season. He was scheduled to start a selected number of races for Penske in 1992 and ended up starting 11 races, many of them as a substitute driver for the injured Rick Mears. Mears announced his retirement after the 1992 season and Tracy replaced him in the #4 car.

His first full year of IndyCar competition came in 1993, where he won five times with his first win coming at Long Beach and the others at Cleveland, Toronto, Road America and Laguna Seca. Tracy led the series in laps led and was voted the most improved driver by his peers. The 1994 season started slowly for Tracy as he scored just two points in the first four races. He rebounded from his poor start and finished on the podium in eight of the final twelve races with victories at Detroit, Nazareth, and Laguna Seca. His third-place showing in the points gave Penske a sweep of the top three slots with Al Unser Jr. winning the title and Emerson Fittipaldi second.

After Penske decided to return to running a two-car team for 1995, Penske attempted to transfer Tracy's contract to Bettenhausen Motorsports, however, Tracy's father discovered a clause in his original contract that it could not be assigned, putting Penske in a bind. Tracy tested for Benetton at Estoril in 1994, setting a faster time than Benetton drivers JJ Lehto and Jos Verstappen had managed for that year's Portuguese Grand Prix, and was only 0.7 sec off of Gerhard Berger's pole time for the same race. Tracy was only offered a restrictive contract with few guarantees and ultimately decided to stay in North America. Tracy was permitted to sign with Newman/Haas Racing for the 1995 season for $1.5 million, with Penske holding an option after that year, where he won two races (Australia and Milwaukee) and finished 6th in the championship.

Penske, after a disappointing 1995, used his option and matched Newman/Haas's offer for the 1996 season of a four-year contract of $3.5 million annually. Tracy's return was a disappointment as he finished the season with no wins and 13th in the championship. A back injury also forced him to miss two races. 1997 was a roller-coaster season, with consecutive wins at Nazareth, Rio de Janeiro and Gateway putting him in the points lead. The season went downhill soon after as he finished 26th or worse in each of the final five events to slip to fifth place in the championship. After a disappointing finish in Toronto, Tracy referred to his car as a "piece of shit" to local media and also said that the Penske chassis was obsolete and that the team should switch tire manufacturers. Penske waited until the end of the season before terminating Tracy for making detrimental remarks about the team and sponsors.

Team Green years
Tracy was signed by Team Kool Green for the 1998 season. The year was a struggle for the team and Tracy personally, as he finished no better than fifth in any race and ended up a disappointing 13th in the championship. The low point of the year came in Houston when he crashed out of second place after colliding with his teammate Dario Franchitti, leading to an altercation with team owner Barry Green when Tracy returned to the pits. He had a chance at redemption and a million-dollar purse in the last race of the season, the Marlboro 500, but while leading the race under caution 3 laps from the finish, he spun off the track while attempting to warm up his tires for the restart. Barry Green commented, "That just sums up our season."

Several on and off-track incidents during the year earned him the wrath of CART officials and he was excluded from the 1999 season opener. Although he missed the first race, Tracy still had a very successful season as he recorded seven podium finishes and had victories at Milwaukee and Houston. He finished third in the championship.

The 2000 season was also a success for Tracy as he won at Long Beach, Road America and Vancouver and finished fifth in the championship.

Tracy's fourth year with Team Green in 2001 was one of the worst of his career as he went winless and finished 14th in the championship. 2002 was another year of struggle for Tracy. He did win a race at Milwaukee but failed to finish 10 of 19 races and was 11th in the championship.

With Team Green, Tracy returned to the Indianapolis 500 in 2002 for the first time since 1995. A late-race caution flag for a crash appeared at nearly the same time he passed Hélio Castroneves for what would have been the race lead. Team Green protested the result but the official investigation put the determination of the leader of the race as the sole discretion of the race officials. Tracy and Barry Green contended that the decision was made to stop a CART driver beating the regulars of the rival Indy Racing League, which was run by Indianapolis Motor Speedway owner Tony George.

Forsythe years
During the 2002 CART season, Team Green was purchased by Tracy's long-time rival Michael Andretti, who intended to move the team to the IRL, and had sold 7-Eleven a sponsorship based on Tracy staying with the team. Not wanting to drive what he referred to as "crapwagons," Tracy instead opted to join the Player's Forsythe team for the 2003 season. Tracy had one of the best seasons in CART history, becoming the first driver in 32 years to win the first three races of a season with victories in St. Petersburg, Monterrey, and Long Beach. Perhaps the highlight of Tracy's career was at the 2003 Molson Indy Toronto, where he led all 112 laps.  Tracy also won Vancouver, Mid-Ohio, and Mexico City, and led 658 laps, earned six poles, and ten podiums on the way to his first-ever championship.

Due to revised Canadian Tobacco laws, Player's could not return as a sponsor for the following season. At the same time, CART went bankrupt and its assets were auctioned off in an Indiana court by Kevin Kalkhoven, Paul Gentilozzi, and Tracy's team owner Gerald Forsythe. The lack of sponsor money certainly did not help the team and Tracy was unable to defend his championship in 2004. He finished fourth in the series, with wins at Long Beach and Vancouver.

The 2005 season started strong for Tracy. He led the points standings after five races, winning at Milwaukee and Cleveland. Bad luck and mistakes characterized the rest of his season, however. He was leading at Toronto when he ran out of fuel and crashed on his own while leading at Denver. A hard crash with Sébastien Bourdais at Las Vegas ended his championship hopes. Tracy finished fourth in the standings for the second year in a row.

In May 2006, it was announced that Tracy had re-signed with Forsythe Racing for an additional five seasons. During the San Jose Grand Prix, Tracy made a mistake entering a turn and went off the track into a run-off area. As he rejoined the track, he pulled into the path of Alex Tagliani's unsighted Team Australia car as it rounded the blind corner, causing a collision that destroyed the front end of Tagliani's car and took both drivers out of the race. After the crash, Tagliani angrily confronted Tracy in the pits and demanded that he pay for the damage. Tracy then warned Tagliani not to touch him, but the latter persisted and eventually, the two men came to blows before being separated by Champ Car officials. Tracy noted that Tagliani was still wearing his helmet during the scuffle. Both men were fined, while Tracy was put on probation for three races and lost seven points.

During the next race in Denver, Tracy and French Newman-Haas driver Sébastien Bourdais, while fighting for second on the last lap, collided in a turn after Tracy attempted to pass. Bourdais shoved Tracy, who then took off his helmet and threatened to fight, and Bourdais walked away.  Tracy was docked three points in the championship and was fined US$25,000.  Bourdais demanded that Tracy be suspended, since he felt that Tracy had cost him several points that he could have used to widen his lead in the points standings over Tracy's teammate, A. J. Allmendinger.

Tracy criticized Bourdais for not confronting him after the incident: "Too bad he wouldn't take his helmet off, then we really would have settled things. But French guys always keep their helmets on". Tracy downplayed the remarks, claiming they were a joke. Bourdais fired back at Tracy, saying: "I guess I'm not a hockey player and I didn't see him taking his helmet off either. I guess if he wants to fight someone, he is in the wrong sport."  Tagliani added: "I said he (Tracy) should wear a straitjacket because that's the only thing that could keep him under control. And Sébastien said he can't drive with that on, so maybe it's the only thing that could keep him out of trouble".

Bourdais, Tagliani, and Quebec driver Andrew Ranger asked for the crowd to boo Tracy at the next race in Montreal, on the weekend of August 26. During the warm-ups and qualifying sessions in Montreal, the crowd at Circuit Gilles Villeneuve booed Tracy loudly. However, during the traditional drivers' presentation before the race, Tracy wore a mask resembling that of Blue Demon and a Quebec flag as a cape while doing wrestling gestures, and the fans began to warm up to him. Tracy finished the rain-delayed race in the second position behind Bourdais on the following Monday. Fans cheered for Tracy as he wore a Quebec flag on the podium.

In November 2006, Tracy was injured while riding an ATV, but a rumor started that he had jumped a sand trap in a golf cart. Tracy denied the rumor and stated that he does not even own a golf cart. In January 2007, Tracy vowed to win the 2007 Champ Car title. However, on April 14 during a practice session at Long Beach, he crashed into a concrete barrier and suffered a fractured vertebra which forced him to miss the race and the next one in Houston. In late May, he was given the green light by doctors to return into action for the race in Portland on June 10.

IndyCar Series career

Following the unification of open-wheel racing in North America, Forsythe announced that he would not be moving on to race in the IRL-sanctioned IndyCar Series in 2008, but initially refused to release Tracy from his contract, forcing the parties into litigation.  The delay meant Tracy was unable to find a full-time ride for the season, only appearing for Forsythe in the Champ Car sanctioned 2008 race at Long Beach and for a Subway-sponsored Vision Racing/Walker Racing joint effort in the Rexall Edmonton Indy, finishing 4th.

Tracy drove a limited schedule for KV Racing Technology sponsored by Geico Insurance, finishing 9th in the Indianapolis 500, and also ran races at Milwaukee (for A. J. Foyt Enterprises), Edmonton, Toronto, Mid-Ohio,  and Watkins Glen.

In 2010, Tracy would attempt 6 races, three with KV Racing and three with Dreyer & Reinbold Racing. Tracy's best was a 6th at Edmonton with KV, he failed to qualify for the Indianapolis 500. The following year, Tracy announced he would return to Dreyer & Reinbold Racing in the 23 WIX Filters car for the 2011 Indianapolis 500. Tracy would make six more starts with Jay Penske's Dragon Racing in 2011, racing the number 8 Make A Wish Foundation/ARMA Energy car at Long Beach, Texas, Toronto, and Edmonton.  Tracy also raced for Dragon in the 2011 IZOD IndyCar World Championship in Las Vegas, where he was involved in the 15 car pileup on Lap 11 that resulted in the death of Dan Wheldon.  Tracy announced he would retire from open-wheel racing following the accident.

Other racing
Tracy dabbled in the NASCAR Busch Series, and attempted to gain a full-season contract in 2007. However, after poor results in the first three Busch races, Tracy reconsidered and stayed in Champ Car. Tracy also competed in one Camping World Truck Series race in 2008 at Texas Motor Speedway, where he finished 20th for Germain Racing.

In July 2013, Tracy ran in the Stadium Super Trucks, making his debut at Toronto.

Personal
Tracy has been married three times and has two children. He resides in Scottsdale, Arizona. On July 16, 2015, Tracy announced via his Instagram that he had become a citizen of the United States while maintaining his citizenship of Canada. He is nicknamed "The Thrill from West Hill" for his connection to West Hill, Toronto.

Tracy has also dabbled as a professional downhill mountain bike racer. He raced for Yeti Bicycles and made appearances in the pro class at famous bike races such as the legendary Kamikaze at Mammoth mountain. Penske developed a special upside-down suspension fork for Yeti Cycles and Tracy. Kaiser Aerospace in partnership with Yeti Cycles built one of the first thermoplastic carbon fiber bicycles for Tracy at $500,000.

Trivia
Tracy appeared as an on-screen extra in an episode of The Littlest Hobo titled "Torque" (1985, Season 6).

Motorsports results

Career summary

American open–wheel racing results
(key)

American Racing Series

CART / Champ Car

IndyCar Series

 1 Run on same day.
 2 Non-points-paying, exhibition race.
 3 The Las Vegas Indy 300 was abandoned after Dan Wheldon died from injuries sustained in a 15-car crash on lap 11.

Indianapolis 500

Sports car racing

Can-Am

Grand-Am Rolex Sports Car Series

(key) (Races in bold indicate pole position, Results are overall/class)

24 Hours of Daytona

NASCAR
(key) (Bold – Pole position awarded by qualifying time. Italics – Pole position earned by points standings or practice time. * – Most laps led.)

Busch Series

Craftsman Truck Series

Stadium Super Trucks
(key) (Bold – Pole position. Italics – Fastest qualifier. * – Most laps led.)

Superstar Racing Experience
(key) * – Most laps led. 1 – Heat 1 winner. 2 – Heat 2 winner.

 Season still in progress

See also
 List of Champ Car drivers
 List of Canadians in Champ Car

References

External links

 
 IndyCar Driver Page
 Champcarstats.com
 Driver Database
 

1968 births
24 Hours of Daytona drivers
Champ Car champions
Champ Car drivers
Indianapolis 500 drivers
Indy Lights champions
Indy Lights drivers
IndyCar Series drivers
Living people
Motorsport announcers
NASCAR drivers
Racing drivers from Ontario
Rolex Sports Car Series drivers
Sportspeople from Scarborough, Toronto
Stadium Super Trucks drivers
Dale Coyne Racing drivers
Team Penske drivers
Newman/Haas Racing drivers
Andretti Autosport drivers
Forsythe Racing drivers
Dragon Racing drivers
Meyer Shank Racing drivers
Action Express Racing drivers
Dreyer & Reinbold Racing drivers
Vision Racing drivers
Walker Racing drivers
KV Racing Technology drivers
A. J. Foyt Enterprises drivers